Fedot Tumusov (born June 30, 1955, Urgench, Xorazm Region) is a Russian political figure and a deputy of the 5th, 6th, 7th, and 8th State Dumas.
 
From 1987 to 1989, Tumusov was an instructor of the Yakut branch of the Regional Committee of the Communist Party of the Soviet Union. From 1991 to 1993, he was the Chairman of the Permanent Commission of the Supreme Council of the Republic of Sakha (Yakutia) for the introduction of market relations and entrepreneurship. He also worked as an advisor to the Head of the Sakha Republic Mikhail Nikolayev. From 1993 to 2003, he was the president of the Sakhaalmazprofinvest fund that aimed to create effective mechanisms for solving socio-economic and environmental problems of the republic. From 2002 to 2007, he was the deputy of the State Assembly of the Sakha Republic of the 3rd and 4th convocations. In 2007, he was elected deputy of the 5th State Duma. In 2011, 2016, and 2021, Tumusov was re-elected for the 6th, 7th, and 8th State Dumas.

References
 

 

1955 births
Living people
A Just Russia politicians
21st-century Russian politicians
Eighth convocation members of the State Duma (Russian Federation)
Seventh convocation members of the State Duma (Russian Federation)
Sixth convocation members of the State Duma (Russian Federation)
Fifth convocation members of the State Duma (Russian Federation)